Drury railway station, formerly known as Drury Central railway station, is an under construction railway station in Auckland, New Zealand. It is due to open in 2025 as part of the Auckland railway electrification project. It will serve the Drury area in south Auckland. The station will be located on the existing rail line, south of Waihoehoe Road, between Flanagan Rd and Great South Rd.

History
As part of the New Zealand Upgrade Programme, Jacinda Ardern's government announced $371 million in funding towards the electrification of track from Papakura to Pukekohe, and a separate $247 million towards the construction of two new stations in Drury Central and Drury West. This was later expanded to include a third station at Paerata.

Planning consent was granted for the Drury Central and Paerata stations in February 2022, with further work being undertaken to gain approval for the Drury West station.

The new stations have attracted criticism from public transport advocates, who say that they are too designed for auto-dependency.

In May 2022, KiwiRail and Auckland Transport announced proposed names for the three stations, replacing the placeholder names of Paerata, Drury West, and Drury Central. These names were gifted by mana whenua, in order to restore the original te reo Māori names of the area. The placeholder name of Drury Central was replaced by Maketuu, paying tribute to the traditional name of the Maketuu stream, as well as the historic name of Te Maketuu Pā, nowadays known as the Pratts Road Historic Reserve, which are both located nearby.

In August 2022, the New Zealand Geographic Board returned its verdict on the name, rejecting the use of double vowels as preferred by the Mana Whenua Forum, and also rejecting the use of 'Maketuu' as a name, saying it had little association with the local area and may be confusing. Instead, they recommended the name 'Drury'. The iwi involved expressed strong dislike of the decision, saying that the new proposed name is heavily associated with colonisation, and exclusive of Māori ancestral interests in the area. The public consultations on the name change ran until early November that year. The Board's recommended name was approved by the Land Information Minister Damien O'Connor in March 2023.

References

Proposed railway stations in New Zealand
Rail transport in Auckland
Railway stations in New Zealand
Railway stations scheduled to open in 2025